The North Yemeni League or the Yemen Arab Republic Football League, was the professional association football league held for domestic football clubs in North Yemen, held between 1978 and 1990. The league folded when South and North Yemen unified as one country (Yemen) on 22 May 1990. This resulted in the creation of the Yemeni League.

Al-Ahli are the most successful team, with four league titles in the North Yemeni League. The North Yemen Cup of the Republic was the league's domestic cup.

Title winners 

 1978/79 - Al-Wahda
 1979/80 - Al-Zuhra
 1980/81 - Al-Ahli 
 1981/82 - Al-Shaab 
 1982/83 Al-Ahli 
 1983/84 Al-Ahli 
 1985/86 Al-Shorta 
 1987/88 Al-Ahli 
 1988/89 Al-Yarmouk 
 1989/90 Al-Yarmouk

References 

 

1970 in Yemen